The Arapey Chico River is a river of Uruguay.

Dividing Artigas and Salto Departments, it flows into the Arapey Grande River.

See also
List of rivers of Uruguay

References
Rand McNally, The New International Atlas, 1993.
 GEOnet Names Server

Rivers of Uruguay
Rivers of Salto Department
Tributaries of the Uruguay River